= Jules Cuttoli =

French politician

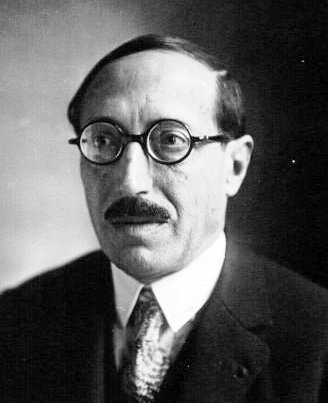
Jules Cuttoli 1929

Jules Cuttoli (23 September 1871 – 29 September 1942) was a French politician.

Cuttoli was born in Algiers, Algeria. He represented the Radical Party in the Chamber of Deputies from 1928 to 1936.
